WTAT-TV (channel 24) is a television station in Charleston, South Carolina, United States, affiliated with the Fox network. The station is owned by Cunningham Broadcasting, a partner company of the Sinclair Broadcast Group. However, although Sinclair effectively owns WTAT-TV (as the majority of Cunningham's stock is owned by the family of deceased group founder Julian Smith), it is one of two Cunningham-owned stations not to be operated by Sinclair (the other is fellow Fox affiliate WYZZ-TV in Peoria, Illinois, which is operated by the Nexstar Media Group as virtual sister station of that market's CBS affiliate WMBD-TV). WTAT-TV's studios are located on Arco Lane in North Charleston (with a Charleston postal address), and its transmitter is located in Awendaw, South Carolina.

History
The station began operations on September 7, 1985, as Charleston's first independent station, under the ownership of Charleston Television Community Ltd., a local group led by Terry Trousdale, who also had the construction permit for the station. It aired an analog signal on UHF channel 24 from a transmitter near Awendaw. On October 9, 1986, as part of a deal between WTAT's owner and News Corporation, it became a charter affiliate of the fledgling Fox network. WTAT would have been the obvious choice as Charleston's Fox affiliate even without that affiliation deal, as it was the area's only general-entertainment independent station at the time.

In 1987, Charleston Television Community Ltd. sold WTAT-TV to Act III Broadcasting, owner of WNRW-TV in Winston-Salem, North Carolina, for $3.3-$3.7 million; this was Act III's second station acquisition.

Abry Communications bought the Act III group in early 1994. Abry formed Sullivan Broadcasting in 1995 to operate the Act III stations. In 1995, WTAT picked up UPN as a secondary affiliate until 1997 when former WB affiliate WMMP joined UPN. In 1998, Sullivan Broadcasting sold its stations to Sinclair Broadcast Group, which in turn, had to sell WTAT-TV, along with WRGT-TV and WVAH-TV to Glencairn, Ltd.

By the time Sinclair tried to acquire Sullivan's stations outright in 2001, it already owned WMMP, which it had purchased outright from Max Media Properties (a company partially related to the present-day Max Media) in July 1998. Sinclair could not legally keep both WTAT and WMMP because Charleston has only six full-power stations—too few to legally permit a duopoly. Although WTAT was longer-established, Sinclair opted to keep WMMP and sold WTAT to Glencairn, Ltd. That company was owned by Edwin Edwards, a former Sinclair executive, and appeared to be a minority-owned company. However, nearly all of Glencairn's stock was controlled by the Smith family, founders of Sinclair. In effect, Sinclair now had a duopoly in the Charleston market in violation of FCC regulations. Glencairn and Sinclair further circumvented the rules by crafting a local marketing agreement with WMMP as the senior partner, allowing Sinclair to continue operating WTAT.

In 2001, the FCC fined Sinclair $40,000 for illegally controlling Glencairn. Later that year, this was renamed Cunningham Broadcasting. However, nearly all of Cunningham's stock is still controlled by trusts in the names of the children of the Smith brothers. Then as now, all of Cunningham's stations are located in markets where Sinclair cannot legally form a duopoly, and are operated by Sinclair stations via LMAs. Glencairn, and later Cunningham, have been accused of serving as a shell corporation that allows Sinclair to circumvent FCC ownership rules. On May 15, 2012, Sinclair and Fox agreed to a five-year extension of the network's affiliation agreement with Sinclair's 19 Fox stations, including WTAT, allowing them to continue carrying Fox programming until at least 2017.

On March 20, 2014, as part of a restructuring of Sinclair's August 2013 deal to purchase Allbritton Communications (owner of ABC affiliate WCIV, then on channel 4) in order to address ownership conflicts with the deal involving WMMP's local marketing agreement with WTAT, Sinclair announced that it planned to terminate the shared services agreement with Cunningham Broadcasting (which would have made WTAT the first Cunningham station in which Sinclair would not hold any operational interest). Cunningham, which was to have acquired the non-license assets of WTAT, sought a shared services agreement with the prospective owner of WMMP, which Sinclair was to have sold in order to receive approval of its purchase of WCIV. This plan never materialized as Sinclair retained WWMP (to which Sinclair moved the WCIV intellectual unit including its call sign), and WTAT continued to be operated by Sinclair until some point in 2019 or 2020, when Cunningham took full control of the station although it continues its news share agreement with WCIV.

Programming
In addition to the Fox network schedule, syndicated programming broadcast by WTAT-TV includes Dr. Phil, Judge Judy, The People's Court, TMZ, and Two and a Half Men. Since September 2016, Xploration Station has aired on WTAT-TV after moving from WCSC-TV's digital subchannel. It airs Saturday mornings beginning at 10 a.m., the time specified for Fox's East Coast affiliates.

News operation

In the early-1990s, Fox required most of its major market affiliates to add local newscasts or face disaffiliation. As a result, WTAT entered into a news share agreement with CBS affiliate WCSC-TV (channel 5, then owned by Crump Communications). The partnership resulted in a nightly half-hour prime time broadcast to debut on this station (currently titled The Fox 24 News at 10).

That program was one of the first prime time newscasts in South Carolina along with fellow Fox affiliate WACH in Columbia which established a similar outsourcing arrangement with NBC affiliate WIS in that market several years later. Eventually, an hour-long extension of WCSC's weekday morning show was added to WTAT. Known as The Fox 24 News at 7, this was seen until 8 offering the area's only local alternative to the national morning broadcasts aired on the big three networks.

WTAT's shows had no WCSC branding and originated from the CBS affiliate's studio (studio 2) on Charlie Hall Boulevard in Charleston's West Ashley section along Glenn McConnell Parkway. The music package and graphics scheme used on all newscasts can be seen on other Sinclair-owned television stations that operate their own in-house news departments. Although WTAT featured the majority of WCSC's on-air personnel, this station maintained a separate second news anchor on weeknights that also contributes to WCSC. This outlet was one of many company-owned stations (including WGME, WICS, WLOS, and KGAN along with others) that did not participate in the wider implementation of Sinclair's now-defunct, controversial News Central format. This centralized operation had national news segments, all weather forecasts, and some sports coverage based at company headquarters on Beaver Dam Road in Hunt Valley, Maryland that supplemented local content at most of Sinclair's in-house news departments. WTAT did air The Point (a one-minute conservative political commentary) that was also controversial and a requirement of all company-owned stations with newscasts until the series was discontinued in December 2006.

On September 29, 2008, WCSC set a broadcasting benchmark in the area when it became the first television outlet to offer newscasts in high definition. The upgrade included new custom Raycom Media corporate graphics, a re-designed HD logo, and updated music package. The WTAT broadcasts at that time, however, were still only aired in pillarboxed 4:3 standard definition as this station lacked a high definition-capable master control at its separate facility in order to receive the newscast in HD.

On August 31, 2009, the weeknight prime time show at 10 was expanded to an hour while the weekend edition remained 35 minutes in length. It would not be until January 24, 2011, when the station completed a master control upgrade allowing the reception and transmission of local programming, including local news, in high definition. During weather forecasts, WTAT features WCSC's own Collins ADC Doppler weather radar (known as "Live Super Doppler MAX") in addition to NOAA's National Weather Service radar images from several regional sites.

Since January 1, 2016, WTAT's newscasts have been produced by WCIV. This change also came with a new anchor for the 10 p.m. news hour and an expanded morning news (7–9 a.m.).

On January 9, 2017, WTAT's newscasts expanded to include a traditional newscast at 6:30 p.m. and a news magazine-type program at 11 p.m. (FOX 24 News NOW) which is broadcast from their studios on Arco Lane in North Charleston.

Technical information

Subchannels
The station's digital signal is multiplexed:

Analog-to-digital conversion
WTAT-TV shut down its analog signal, over UHF channel 24, on February 17, 2009, to conclude the federally mandated transition from analog to digital television. The station's digital signal relocated from its pre-transition UHF channel 40 to channel 24.

References

External links

WCIV website

TAT-TV
Fox network affiliates
True Crime Network affiliates
Comet (TV network) affiliates
Charge! (TV network) affiliates
TBD (TV network) affiliates
Television channels and stations established in 1985
1985 establishments in South Carolina